is a former Japanese football player. He played for Japan national team.

Club career
Masuda was born in Shizuoka on December 25, 1973. After graduating from Shizuoka Gakuen High School, he joined Kashima Antlers in 1992. He debuted in 1994 and played many games as offensive midfielder. The club won the champions at 1996 J1 League and 1997 J.League Cup. However he got hurt in August 1998. Although he came back in September 1999, his opportunity to play decreased. He moved to FC Tokyo in June 2000. After that, he played for JEF United Ichihara (2002), Kashiwa Reysol (2003-2005) and Oita Trinita (2006). He retired end of 2006 season.

National team career
On February 15, 1998, Masuda debuted for Japan national team against Australia.

Club statistics

National team statistics

References

External links
 
 
 Japan National Football Team Database

1973 births
Living people
Association football people from Shizuoka Prefecture
Japanese footballers
Japan international footballers
J1 League players
Kashima Antlers players
FC Tokyo players
JEF United Chiba players
Kashiwa Reysol players
Oita Trinita players
Association football midfielders